Lucy Foley is a British author of contemporary, historical fiction and mystery novels. Her novels The Paris Apartment and The Guest List are New York Times best sellers.

Education 
Foley studied English literature at University College London and Durham University.

Career 
Foley worked as an editor at Headline Publishing Group and Hodder & Stoughton before writing full-time.

The Guest List (2020) 
The Guest List is a thriller novel published June 2, 2020 by William Morrow. The book is a New York Times and Washington Post best seller.

The Guest List received a starred review from Library Journal, as well as positive reviews from Booklist, The New York Times Book Review, Good Housekeeping, Marie Claire, The Washington Post, Buzzfeed, Harper's Bazaar, Shelf Awareness, and PopSugar. Publishers Weekly provided a mixed review.

The book also received the following accolades:

 New York Times Best Thrillers of 2020
 Goodreads Choice Award for Mystery & Thriller (2020)
 CWA Gold Dagger Award Longlist (2020)

The Paris Apartment (2022) 
The Paris Apartment was published February 22, 2022. It is a mystery/thriller novel. The book was named one of the most anticipated books of the year by Goodreads and Good Housekeeping.

Works 

 The Paris Apartment (2022)
 The Guest List (2020)
 The Hunting Party (2019)
 Last Letter from Istanbul (2018)
 The Invitation (2016)
 The Book of Lost and Found (2015)

References 

Living people
21st-century British novelists
Alumni of University College London
Writers from London
Alumni of Grey College, Durham
1986 births